This is a list of bridges documented by the Historic American Engineering Record in the U.S. state of New Jersey.

Bridges

See also
List of tunnels documented by the Historic American Engineering Record in New Jersey

References

List
List
New Jersey
Bridges
Bridges